Baychurovo is a rural locality (a selo) and the administrative center of Baychurovskoye Rural Settlement, Povorinsky District, Voronezh Oblast, Russia. The population was 1,577 as of 2010. There are 19 streets.

Geography 
Baychurovo is located 42 km northeast of Povorino (the district's administrative centre) by road. Kamenka is the nearest rural locality.

References 

Rural localities in Povorinsky District